The Loyola University Museum of Art (LUMA), which opened in the fall of 2005, is unique among Chicago's many museums for mounting exhibits that explore the spiritual in art from all cultures, faiths, and eras. LUMA is located on Loyola University Chicago's Water Tower Campus in downtown Chicago, at 820 North Michigan Ave.

LUMA's permanent collection comprises the Martin D'Arcy Collection of medieval, Renaissance, and Baroque art and objects ranging in date from 1150 to 1800. Established in 1969 by Donald Rowe, S.J., the collection contains over 300 pieces. It was named after British humanist and Jesuit theologian Martin D'Arcy, S.J., who amassed an art collection at Campion Hall, Oxford University, in England. The collection was formerly located in the E.M. Cudahy Memorial Library on Loyola's Lake Shore Campus, in Rogers Park, Chicago.

Selected exhibitions
 Caravaggio Una Mostra Impossibile (October 8, 2005 – February 11, 2006)
 Carlos Saura: Flamenco (February 18–March 27, 2006)
 The Missing Peace: Artists Consider the Dalai Lama (October 28, 2006 – January 15, 2007)
 A Blessing to One Another: Pope John Paul II and The Jewish People (April 14–August 12, 2007)
 Andy Warhol's Silver Clouds (February 16–April 27, 2008)
 Manifest Destiny/Manifest Responsibility: Environmentalism and the Art of the American Landscape (May 17–August 10, 2008)
 On the Same Map: Hope is a Human Right—A Photographic Journey of Partners in Health (November 29, 2008 – January 4, 2009)
 Rodin: In His Own Words—Selections from the Iris and B. Gerald Cantor Foundation (June 13–August 16, 2009)
 Back to the Future: Alfred Jensen, Charmion von Wiegand, Simon Gouverneur, and the Cosmic Conversation (September 12–November 15, 2009)
 Moholy: An Education of the Senses (February 10–May 9, 2010)
 The Papercut Haggadah by Archie Granot (February 10–May 9, 2010)
 Pilgrimage and Faith: Buddhism, Christianity, and Islam (August 21–November 14, 2010)
 Eric Gill: Iconographer (February 12–May 1, 2011)
 Inscribing the Divine: The Saint John's Bible (August 20–October 23, 2011)
 Heaven + Hell (February 10-June 30, 2012) a collaborative exhibition with Intuit: The Center for Intuitive and Outsider Art, Chicago
 Andra Samelson: Cosmologies (July 20 – November 3, 2013)
 Santitos (November 23, 2013 – January 12, 2014)
 Elegant Enigmas: The Art of Edward Gorey (February 15–June 15, 2014), Co-presented by the Loyola University Chicago Libraries.
 Shaker in Chicago (February 7–April 26, 2015), a dual exhibition  presenting an overview of the history of the United Society of Believers for Christ’s Second Appearing, featuring Gather Up the Fragments: The Andrews Shaker Collection and As It Is in Heaven: The Legacy of Shaker Faith and Design William Utermohlen: A Persistence of Memory (February 6 – July 23, 2016)
 Wayang: The Art of Indonesian Puppetry (February 4, 2017 – June 3, 2017), Courtesy of the May Weber Collection, Loyola University Chicago.
 Steve Schapiro: Misericordia: Together We Celebrate (February 4, 2017 – June 3, 2017)
 Jeffrey Wolin: Pigeon Hill: Then and Now (July 1, 2017 – October 21, 2017)
 Susan Aurinko: Searching for Jehanne – the Joan of Arc Project (July 1, 2017 – October 21, 2017)
 Gregory Beals: They Arrived Last Night (February 6, 2018 – June 2, 2018)
 Her Story, My Dreams: The Images of Della Wells (February 6, 2018 – June 2, 2018)
 Tonika Lewis Johnson: Everyday Englewood (February 6, 2018 – June 2, 2018)

Current exhibitions
 Following the Box (July 3 – October 20, 2018), curated by Alan Teller and Jerri Zbiral
 Tonika Lewis Johnson: Folded Map (July 3 – October 20, 2018)
 Victoria Martinez: Celestial House (July 3 – October 20, 2018)

Annual exhibitionArt and Faith of the Crèche: The Collection of James and Emilia Govan'' shows how artists across the globe depict the nativity with clothes, architecture, and figures from their native lands. This show has run every year around Christmas since 2007, and features nativity scenes from around the world.

Selected artists
 Mary Abbott
 Caravaggio
 David Lee Csicsko
 Arthur Dove
 Stephen Fredericks
 Edward Gorey
 Martin Johnson Heade
 Steve Jablonski
 Wenzel Jamnitzer
 William Smith Jewett
 Gary Kolb
 Joan Mitchell
 Robert Motherwell
 Nicario Jimenez Quispe
 Steve Schapiro
 Shawn Stucky
 Qes Adamu Tesfaw
 Andy Warhol

References

Resources
 

Loyola University Chicago
University museums in Illinois
Art museums and galleries in Illinois
Art museums and galleries in Chicago
Art museums established in 2005
2005 establishments in Illinois